Sam McEntee (born 3 February 1992) is an Australian long-distance runner. He competed at the 2016 Summer Olympics in Rio de Janeiro, in the men's 5000 metres. In 2017, he competed in the senior men's race at the 2017 IAAF World Cross Country Championships held in Kampala, Uganda. He finished in 50th place.

References

External links

1992 births
Living people
Australian male long-distance runners
Olympic athletes of Australia
Athletes (track and field) at the 2016 Summer Olympics
World Athletics Championships athletes for Australia
21st-century Australian people